Edge Creek is a bay in Talbot County, Maryland, in the United States.

Edge Creek was named for James Edge, an 18th-century assessor.

References

Bodies of water of Talbot County, Maryland
Bays of Maryland